Ama Nkrumah was a Ghanaian female political activist during and after Ghana's independence struggle.

Politics
Ama Nkrumah was one of the female political activists who was with Ghana's first president Dr. Kwame Nkrumah through the independence struggle and later served in various political capacities.

In popular culture
Ama Nkrumah is the eponymous subject of the opening poem in Woman, Eat Me Whole, Ghanaian author and spoken-word artist Ama Asantewa Diaka's first poetry collection.

See also
Sophia Oboshie Doku
Hannah Cudjoe
Susanna Al-Hassan

References

20th-century Ghanaian people
20th-century Ghanaian women politicians
Year of birth missing
Place of birth missing
Convention People's Party (Ghana) politicians